The Five Facet Mindfulness Questionnaire (FFMQ) is a psychological measurement that explores mindfulness. 

FFMQ is based on five independently developed mindfulness questionnaires that are bound together in a factor analytic study. The questionnaire consists of 39 items. The five facets are: observing, describing, acting with awareness, non-judging of inner experience, and non-reactivity to inner experience.

The FFMQ  was created by Ruth A. Baer and her colleagues. The article has been cited by over 6000 PubMed Central articles. The FFMQ has been translated into and validated for many languages, including Swedish and French. 

Recently, scholars have also started to rely upon the FFMQ to develop computational models of mindfulness wherein mindfulness is viewed as a set of interrelated skills constitutive of mindfulness.

Criticism
One criticism of the FFMQ is that negative and positive question wording introduces variance unrelated to the constructs being measured, a so-called "method effect".

See also
 Mindfulness

References

Psychological tests and scales
Mindfulness (psychology)